Raymond Tucker Chester (born June 28, 1948) is an American former professional football player who was a tight end in the National Football League (NFL). After graduating from Douglass High School in Baltimore, Maryland, Chester played college football at the historically Black university Morgan State. He was a member of the Morgan State Bears’ 1968 undefeated team, scoring the Bears’ only touchdown in their historic victory over Grambling at Yankee Stadium. 

Drafted in the first round as the 24th pick overall in the 1970 NFL Draft, Chester began his NFL career with the Oakland Raiders. Pulling in seven touchdowns and over five hundred yards receiving in his NFL debut season, Chester received the Rookie of the Year award and secured his first of four career Pro Bowl selections. After a trade in 1973 to the Baltimore Colts, Chester played five seasons with them before returning to Oakland. He played with the Raiders in 1980, becoming a Super Bowl champion after their defeat of the Philadelphia Eagles.

Early years
Born in Cambridge, Maryland, Chester is the fourth of ten siblings born to Ivy and Bertha Chester. His passion for sports began during his years at Frederick Douglass High School in Baltimore, where he excelled in track and wrestling as well as football. He moved on to Morgan State, concentrating his athletic efforts on football under the guidance of head coach Earl Banks. 

During one of the Bears’ three unbeaten seasons in 1968, Chester played in the match-up between Morgan State and Grambling. The historic game was the first of its kind, pitting two historically black colleges against each other on one of the largest stages of that era—Yankee Stadium. 

In that battle, Chester hauled in Morgan State’s only touchdown, leading to the Bears’ ultimate 9–7 victory over the Tigers.

Chester was a member of the 1970 College All-Star team.

Professional career
Chester entered the NFL draft in 1970, selected in the first round by the Oakland Raiders (24th overall) legendary owner Al Davis. He started in his rookie season, contributing to the Raiders’ 8-4-2 season and their appearance in the AFC Division Playoffs. Along with his 42 receptions, 556 yards, and 7 touchdowns, his performance earned him his first of four Pro Bowl selections. He and Davis remained close friends until the latter’s death in 2011.

Chester was acquired by his hometown Baltimore Colts from the Raiders for Bubba Smith on July 16, 1973. During his five seasons with the Colts, he racked up 2,123 yards receiving, 11 touchdowns, and a key contributor to the Colts winning three division titles (’75, ’76, ’77). An outstanding blocker, he often drew criticism for dropped passes and was disgruntled with team management throughout his time with the Colts.

Chester returned to the Raiders after being traded along with a 1979 second-round pick (33rd overall–traded to Tampa Bay Buccaneers for Dave Pear) from the Colts for Mike Siani and a 1979 third-round selection (72nd overall–traded to Houston Oilers) on July 21, 1978. He had his best career statistics in 1979 with 712 reception yards and eight touchdowns. The following year, Chester became a Super Bowl champion when the Raiders defeated the Philadelphia Eagles in Super Bowl XV (27-10).

After the 1981 season, with an impending move to Los Angeles by the Raiders, Chester decided to retire from the NFL. 

He became involved in the development of a new league, the United States Football League (USFL), which consisted of 18 teams, with one coming to Oakland. Chester came out of retirement and played a single season with the Oakland Invaders in 1983. The team won the Pacific division and Chester earned the USFL Man of the Year award.

Post NFL

An avid golfer, Chester managed the Lake Chabot Golf Course for 20 years. Currently he acts as a consultant for golf course development and management. He is a member of the Maryland Athlete Hall of Fame as well as the Central Intercollegiate Athletic Association Hall of Fame. 

In 2014, a campaign was launched by the Black Sports Legends Foundation to get Chester elected to the Pro Football Hall of Fame as well. At that time, Chester said: "I think it’s time that the Hall of Fame selection committee go back and recognize some of the guys who were absolutely the best player in their era...And no one can dispute that I was one of the top three players at my position in my era. No one can dispute that."

References

1948 births
American Conference Pro Bowl players
American football tight ends
Baltimore Colts players
Living people
Oakland Raiders players
Morgan State Bears football players
People from Cambridge, Maryland
Oakland Invaders players
Players of American football from Maryland